The Musée lapidaire Saint-Nicolas is an archaeological museum in Autun, France. It is housed in the former Saint-Nicolas chapel, dating from the 12th century.

Collection 
The museum brings together elements of Gallo-Roman architecture from Augustodunum (capitals, part of the aqueduct, cornices, fragments of fountains and columns). The size of certain columns gives a good idea of the imposing appearance of the disappeared monuments. A gallery of tombs presents an alignment of 130 stelas dating from the 1st to 4th centuries; some elements of medieval craftsmanship (statuary and sarcophagus) are also visible.

The romantic-inspired garden lends the place to sketches and torchlight lighting during the Night of the Museums.

See also 
List of museums in France

References

External links
 Musée Lapidaire Saint-Nicolas - Tourist information 

Museums in Saône-et-Loire
Museums of ancient Rome in France
Archaeological museums in France